Francis Coryndon Carpenter Rowe (29 July 1859 – 5 April 1897) was a cricketer for Cambridge University between 1880 and 1881. A wicket-keeper and left-hand bat, Rowe was born in Ceylon and educated at Harrow School and Trinity College, Cambridge. He played only six matches, with 155 runs at 15.50 and three catches. He died at sea aboard the Pacific Steam Navigation Company liner  while returning from Australia to England aged 37.

Notes

External links

1859 births
1897 deaths
People educated at Harrow School
Alumni of Trinity College, Cambridge
Cambridge University cricketers
Cricketers from Colombo
People from British Ceylon